Machanbaw is a town in the Kachin State of northernmost part of the Myanmar. It is on the Namtiyu River.

External links
Satellite map at Maplandia.com

Township capitals of Myanmar
Populated places in Kachin State